Andy Kerbrat (born 1 October 1990) is a French politician from La France Insoumise. He was elected as member of the National Assembly for Loire-Atlantique's 2nd constituency in the 2022 French legislative election.

Political career 
Kerbtrat defeated incumbent En Marche MP Valérie Oppelt.

See also 

 List of deputies of the 16th National Assembly of France

References 

Living people
1990 births
People from Toulouse

21st-century French politicians
Deputies of the 16th National Assembly of the French Fifth Republic
Members of Parliament for Loire-Atlantique
La France Insoumise politicians